Nicolás Patricio Ortíz Vergara (born 6 April 1984) is a Chilean former professional footballer who played as a defender.

Career
A product of Santiago Morning youth system, he played for several clubs in the Chilean Primera División and Primera B. At the end of 2021 season, A.C. Barnechea announced the retirement of Ortiz along with his teammate Cristián Muñoz from the football activity as a professional footballer.

Honours
Deportes Iquique
 Copa Chile: 2013–14

References

External links
 
 
 Nicolás Ortiz at playmakerstats.com (English version of ceroacero.es)

1984 births
Living people
Footballers from Santiago
Chilean footballers
Association football defenders
Santiago Morning footballers
Coquimbo Unido footballers
San Marcos de Arica footballers
Unión La Calera footballers
Deportes Iquique footballers
C.D. Antofagasta footballers
A.C. Barnechea footballers
Chilean Primera División players
Primera B de Chile players